Yoshiko Yamamoto (born 6 March 1970) is a Japanese former marathon runner who came second at the 1992 Boston Marathon, and third at the 1992 New York City Marathon.

Career
In 1989, Yamamoto came ninth at the Osaka International Ladies Marathon. In 1990, Yamamoto won the Paris Marathon. At the 1992 Boston Marathon, Yamamoto finished second in a time of 2:26:26. She was over 2 minutes, and over  behind race winner Olga Markova. Her second place was the best result by a Japanese woman at the Boston Marathon, and her time of 2:26:26 tied the Japanese national marathon record. Yamamoto was not selected for the 1992 Summer Olympics in Barcelona, Spain. Later in the year, Yamamoto came third at the 1992 New York City Marathon in a time of 2:29:58.

Yamamoto came third at the 1993 Osaka International Ladies Marathon, and finished sixth at the 1995 Boston Marathon, in a time of 2:31:39.

References

1970 births
Living people
Japanese female marathon runners